Postcolonial feminism is a form of feminism that developed as a response to feminism focusing solely on the experiences of women in Western cultures and former colonies. Postcolonial feminism seeks to account for the way that racism and the long-lasting political, economic, and cultural effects of colonialism affect non-white, non-Western women in the postcolonial world. Postcolonial feminism originated in the 1980s as a critique of feminist theorists in developed countries pointing out the universalizing tendencies of mainstream feminist ideas and argues that women living in non-Western countries are misrepresented.

Postcolonial feminism argues that by using the term "woman" as a universal group, women are then only defined by their gender and not by social class, race, ethnicity, or sexual preference. Postcolonial feminists also work to incorporate the ideas of indigenous and other Third World feminist movements into mainstream Western feminism. Third World feminism stems from the idea that feminism in Third World countries is not imported from the First World, but originates from internal ideologies and socio-cultural factors.

Postcolonial feminism is sometimes criticized by mainstream feminism, which argues that postcolonial feminism weakens the wider feminist movement by dividing it. It is also often criticized for its Western bias which will be discussed further below.

History

The history of modern feminist movements can be divided into three waves. When first-wave feminism originated in the late nineteenth century, it arose as a movement among white, middle-class women in the global North who were reasonably able to access both resources and education. Thus, the first wave of feminism almost exclusively addressed the issues of these women who were relatively well off. The first-wavers focused on absolute rights such as suffrage and overturning other barriers to legal gender equality. This population did not include the realities of women of color who felt the force of racial oppression or economically disadvantaged women who were forced out of the home and into blue-collar jobs. However, first-wave feminism did succeed in getting votes for women and also, in certain countries, changing laws relating to divorce and care and maintenance of children.

Second-wave feminism began in the early 1960s and inspired women to look at the sexist power struggles that existed within their personal lives and broadened the conversation to include issues within the workplace, issues of sexuality, family, and reproductive rights. It scored remarkable victories relating to Equal Pay and the removal of gender based discriminatory practices. First and second-wave feminist theory failed to account for differences between women in terms of race and class—it only addressed the needs and issues of white, Western women who started the movement. Postcolonial feminism emerged as part of the third wave of feminism, which began in the 1980s, in tandem with many other racially focused feminist movements in order to reflect the diverse nature of each woman's lived experience. Audre Lorde contributed to the creation of Postcolonial Feminism with her 1984 essay "The Master's Tools Will Never Dismantle the Master's House". Chandra Talpade Mohanty's essay "Under Western Eyes" also came out in 1984, analyzing the homogenizing western feminist depiction of the "third world woman." These works, along with many others, were foundational to the formation of postcolonial feminism.

Many of the first key theorists of postcolonial feminism hail from India and were inspired by their direct experiences with the effects that colonization had left in their society. When colonizers came to India, an importance that was not as prevalent before was placed on gender. Many women lost power and economic autonomy as men gained much more of it, and this had a lasting effect even after India gained independence

In efforts to move away from 'grand narratives' stemmed from 'globalization', postcolonial theory was formed as a scholarly critique of colonial literature. By acknowledging the differences among diverse groups of women, postcolonial feminism addresses what some call the oversimplification of Western feminism as solely a resistance against sexist oppression. Postcolonial feminism, in contrast, also relates gender issues to other spheres of influence within society.

Theory
Postcolonial feminism is a relatively new stream of thought, developing primarily out of the work of the postcolonial theorists who concern themselves with evaluating how different colonial and imperial relations throughout the nineteenth century have impacted the way particular cultures view themselves. This particular strain of feminism promotes a wider viewpoint of the complex layers of oppression that exist within any given society.

Postcolonial feminism began simply as a critique of both Western feminism and postcolonial theory, but later became a burgeoning method of analysis to address key issues within both fields. Unlike mainstream postcolonial theory, which focuses on the lingering impacts that colonialism has had on the current economic and political institutions of countries, postcolonial feminist theorists are interested in analyzing why postcolonial theory fails to address issues of gender. Postcolonial feminism also seeks to illuminate the tendency of Western feminist thought to apply its claims to women around the world because the scope of feminist theory is limited. In this way, postcolonial feminism attempts to account for perceived weaknesses within both postcolonial theory and within Western feminism. The concept of colonization occupies many different spaces within postcolonial feminist theory; it can refer to the literal act of acquiring lands or to forms of social, discursive, political, and economic enslavement in a society.

In Audre Lorde's foundational essay, "The Master's Tools Will Never Dismantle the Master's House", Lorde uses the metaphor of "the master's tools" and "the master's house" to explain that western feminism is failing to make positive change for third world women by using the same tools used by the patriarchy to oppress women. Lorde found that western feminist literature denied differences between women and discouraged embracing them. The differences between women, Lorde asserts, should be used as strengths to create a community in which women use their different strengths to support each other.

Chandra Talpade Mohanty, a principal theorist within the movement, addresses this issue in her seminal essay "Under Western Eyes". In this essay, Mohanty asserts that Western feminists write about Third World women as a composite, singular construction that is arbitrary and limiting. She states that these women are depicted in writings as victims of masculine control and of traditional culture without incorporating information about historical context and cultural differences with the Third World. This creates a dynamic where Western feminism functions as the norm against which the situation in the developing world is evaluated. Mohanty's primary initiative is to allow Third World women to have agency and voice within the feminist realm.

In the article "Third World Women and the Inadequacies of Western Feminism", Ethel Crowley, sociology professor at Trinity College of Dublin, writes about how western feminism is lacking when applied to non-western societies. She accuses western feminists of theoretical reductionism when it comes to Third World women. Her major problem with western feminism is that it spends too much time in ideological "nit-picking" instead of formulating strategies to redress the highlighted problems. The most prominent point that Crowley makes in her article is that ethnography can be essential to problem solving, and that freedom does not mean the same thing to all the women of the world.

Relationship to Western feminisms
Postcolonial feminism began as a criticism of the failure of Western feminism to cope with the complexity of postcolonial feminist issues as represented in Third World feminist movements. Postcolonial feminists seek to incorporate the struggle of women in the global South into the wider feminist movement. Western feminists and feminists outside of the West also often differ in terms of race and religion, which is not acknowledged in Western feminism and can cause other differences. Western feminism tends to ignore or deny these differences, which discursively forces Third World women to exist within the world of Western women and their oppression to be ranked on an ethnocentric Western scale.

Postcolonial feminists do not agree that women are a universal group and reject the idea of a global sisterhood. Thus, the examination of what truly binds women together is necessary in order to understand the goals of the feminist movements and the similarities and differences in the struggles of women worldwide. The aim of the postcolonial feminist critique to traditional Western feminism is to strive to understand the simultaneous engagement in more than one distinct but intertwined emancipatory battle.

This is significant because feminist discourses are critical and liberatory in intent and are not thereby exempt from inscription in their internal power relations. The hope of postcolonial feminists is that the wider feminist movement will incorporate these vast arrays of theories which are aimed at reaching a cultural perspective beyond the Western world by acknowledging the individual experiences of women around the world. Ali Suki highlights the lack of representation of women of color in feminist scholarship comparing the weight of whiteness similar to the weight of masculinities. This issue is not due to a shortage of scholarly work in the global South but a lack of recognition and circulation. This reinforces Western hegemony and supports the claim of outweighed representation of white, Western scholars. Most available feminist literature regarding the global South tends to be written by Western theorists resulting in the whitewashing of histories.

Feminist postcolonial theorists are not always unified in their reactions to postcolonial theory and Western feminism, but as a whole, these theorists have significantly weakened the bounds of mainstream feminism. The intent of postcolonial feminism is to reduce homogenizing language coupled with an overall strategy to incorporate all women into the theoretical milieu. While efforts are made to eliminate the idea of the Third World "other", a Western Eurocentric feminist framework often presents the "other" as victim to their culture and traditions. Brina Bose highlights the ongoing process of "alienation and alliance" from other theorists in regards to postcolonial feminism; she emphasizes, "...the obvious danger both in 'speaking for' the silent/silenced as well as in searching for retaliatory power in elusive connections..." There is a tendency throughout many different academic fields and policy strategies to use Western models of societies as a framework for the rest of the world. This critique is supported in other scholarly work including that of Sushmita Chatterjee who describes the complications of adding feminism as a "Western ideological construct to save brown women from their inherently oppressive cultural patriarchy."

Relationship to postcolonial theory
The postcolonial feminist movements look at the gendered history of colonialism and how that continues to affect the status of women today. In the 1940s and 1950s, after the formation of the United Nations, former colonies were monitored by the West for what was considered social progress. The definition of social progress was tied to adherence to Western socio-cultural norms. The status of women in the developing world has been monitored by organizations such as the United Nations. As a result, traditional practices and roles taken up by women, sometimes seen as distasteful by Western standards, could be considered a form of rebellion against colonial rule. Some examples of this include women wearing headscarves or female genital mutilation. These practices are generally looked down upon by Western women, but are seen as legitimate cultural practices in many parts of the world fully supported by practicing women. Thus, the imposition of Western cultural norms may desire to improve the status of women but has the potential to lead to conflict.

In order to understand the postcolonial feminist theory, one must first understand the postcolonial theory. In sociology, postcolonial theory is a theory that is preoccupied with understanding and examining the social impacts of European colonialism, its main claim is that the modern world as it is now is impossible to understand without understanding its relation with and history of imperialism and colonial rule. Postcolonialism can provide an outlet for citizens to discuss various experiences from the colonial period. These can include: "migration, slavery, oppression, resistance, representation, difference, race, gender, place and responses to the influential discourses of imperial Europe." Ania Loomba critiques the terminology of 'postcolonial' by arguing the fact that 'post' implicitly implies the aftermath of colonization; she poses the question, "when exactly then, does the 'postcolonial' begin?" Postcolonial feminists see the parallels between recently decolonized nations and the state of women within patriarchy taking "perspective of a socially marginalized subgroup in their relationship to the dominant culture." In this way feminism and postcolonialism can be seen as having a similar goal in giving a voice to those that were voiceless in the traditional dominant social order. While this holds significant value aiding new theory and debate to arise, there is no single story of global histories and Western imperialism is still significant. Loomba suggests that colonialism carries both an inside and outside force in the evolution of a country concluding 'postcolonial' to be loaded with contradictions.

Race and religion

Postcolonial feminism has strong ties with indigenous movements and wider postcolonial theory. It is also closely affiliated with black feminism because both black feminists and postcolonial feminists argue that mainstream Western feminism fails to adequately account for racial differences. Racism has a major role to play in the discussion of postcolonial feminism. Postcolonial feminists seek to tackle the ethnic conflict and racism that still exist and aims to bring these issues into feminist discourse. In the past, mainstream Western feminism has largely avoided the issue of race, relegating it to a secondary issue behind patriarchy and somewhat separate from feminism. Until more recent discourse, race was not seen as an issue that white women needed to address.

In her article "Age, Race, Class and Sex: Women Redefining Difference", Lorde succinctly explained that, "as white women ignore their built-in privilege and define woman in terms of their own experiences alone, then women of Color become 'other'..." which prevents the literary work produced by women of color from being represented in mainstream feminism.

Postcolonial feminism attempts to avoid speaking as if women were a homogeneous population with no differences in race, sexual preference, class, or even age. The notion of whiteness, or lack thereof, is a key issue within the postcolonial feminist movement. This is primarily due to the perceived relationship between postcolonial feminism and other racially based feminist movements, especially Black feminism and indigenous feminisms. In Western culture, racism is sometimes viewed as an institutionalized, ingrained facet of society. Postcolonial feminists want to force feminist theory to address how individual people can acknowledge racist presumptions, practices, and prejudices within their own lives attempting to halt its perpetuation through awareness.

Vera C. Mackie describes the history of feminist rights and women's activism in Japan from the late nineteenth century to present day. Women in Japan began questioning their place in the social class system and began questioning their roles as subjects under the Emperor. The book goes into detail about iconic Japanese women who stood out against gender oppression, including documents from Japanese feminists themselves. Japan's oppression of women is written about displaying that women from yet another culture do not live under the same circumstances as women from western/white cultures. There are different social conducts that occur in Asian countries that may seem oppressive to white feminists; according to Third World feminist ideologies, it is ideal to respect the culture that these women are living in while also implementing the same belief that they should not be oppressed or seen in any sort of sexist light. Chilla Bulbeck discusses how feminism strives to fight for equality of the sexes through equal pay, equal opportunity, reproductive rights, and education. She also goes on to write about how these rights apply to women in the global South as well but that depending on their country and culture, each individual's experience and needs are unique.

"False consciousness" is perpetuated throughout mainstream feminism assuming that people in the global South don't know what is best for them. Postcolonial framework attempts to shed light on these women as "full moral agents" who willingly uphold their cultural practices as a resistance to Western imperialism. For example, representation of the Middle East and Islam focuses on the traditional practice of veiling as a way of oppressing women. While Westerners may view the practice in this way, many women of the Middle East disagree and cannot understand how Western standards of oversexualized dress offer women liberation. Such Eurocentric claims have been referred to by some as imperial feminism.

Colonial and postcolonial race influence
The U.S., where Western culture flourishes most, has a majority white population of 77.4% as of the 2014 U.S. census. They have also been the majority of the population since the 16th century. Whites have had their role in the colonialism of the country since their ancestors settlement of Plymouth Colony in 1620. Although they ruled majority of the U.S. since their settlement, it was only the men who did the colonizing. The women were not allowed to have the same freedoms and rights that men had at the time. It was not until the victory of World War I that the Roaring Twenties emerged and gave women a chance to fight for independence. It is also the reason that first-wave feminist were able to protest. Their first major accomplishment was the ratification of the Nineteenth Amendment. Some of the women that led the first-wave feminist movement were Susan B. Anthony and Elizabeth Cady Stanton. Anthony, Stanton, and many other feminist fought for the equality of rights for both women and African Americans; however, their accomplishments only benefited white middle-class women. The majority of equality achieved through first and second wave feminism and other movements still benefits mainly the white population. The lack of acknowledgement and acceptance of white privilege by white people is a main contributor to the inequality of rights in the United States. In the book Privilege Revealed: How Invisible Preference Undermines, Stephanie M. Wildman states, "The notion of privilege... has not been recognized in legal language and doctrine. This failure to acknowledge privilege, to make it visible in legal doctrine, creates a serious gap in legal reasoning, rendering law unable to address issues of systemic unfairness." White privilege, oppression, and exploitation in the U.S. and Western influenced countries are main contributors to the formation of other feminist and philosophical movements such as black feminism, Islamic feminism, Latinx philosophy, and many other movements.

Relationship to Third World feminism
Depending on feminist literature, Third World and postcolonial feminism can often be used interchangeably. In a review upon other scholars work of the two terms, Nancy A. Naples highlights the differences; "Third World" nations, termed as such by North America and Europe, were characterized as underdeveloped and poor resulting in a dependency of "First World" nations for survival. This term started being widely used in the 1980s but shortly after began to receive criticism from postcolonial scholarship. Naples defines the term 'postcolonial' as, "...typically applied to nations like India where a former colonial power has been removed." Both terms can be argued as problematic due to the reinforced idea of "othering" those from non-Western culture.

Though postcolonial feminism was supposed to represent the evolution of Third World into a more reformed ideology, Ranjoo Seodu Herr argues for Third World Feminism to be reclaimed highlighting the importance of the local/national,"...in order to promote inclusive and democratic feminisms that accommodate diverse and multiple feminist perspectives of Third World women on the ground."

The term is also in relation with other strands of feminism, such as Black feminism and African feminism.

Double colonization 
Double colonization is a term referring to the status of women in the postcolonial world. Postcolonial and feminist theorists state that women are oppressed by both patriarchy and the colonial power, and that this is an ongoing process in many countries even after they achieved independence. Thus, women are colonized in a twofold way by imperialism and male dominance.

Postcolonial feminists are still concerned with identifying and revealing the specific effects double colonization has on female writers and how double colonization is represented and referred to in literature. However, there is an ongoing discussion among theorists about whether the patriarchal or the colonial aspect are more pressing and which topic should be addressed more intensively.

The concept of double colonization is particularly significant when referring to colonial and postcolonial women's writing. It was first introduced in 1986 by Kirsten Holst Petersen and Anna Rutherford in their anthology "A Double Colonization: Colonial and Postcolonial Women's Writing", which deals with the question of female visibility and the struggles of female writers in a primarily male's world. As Aritha van Herk, a Canadian writer and editor, puts it in her essay "A Gentle Circumcision": "Try being female and living in the kingdom of the male virgin; try being female and writing in the kingdom of the male virgin."

Writers that are usually identified with the topic of double colonization and critique on Western feminism are for example Hazel V. Carby and Chandra Talpade Mohanty. "White Woman Listen!", an essay composed by Carby, harshly critiques Western feminists who she accuses of being prejudiced and oppressors of black women rather than supporters. In this context she also talks about "triple" oppression: "The fact that black women are subject to the simultaneous oppression of patriarchy, class and "race" is the prime reason for not employing parallels that render their position and experience not only marginal but also invisible".

Mohanty's argument in "Under Western Eyes: Feminist Scholarship and Colonial Discourses" goes into the same direction. She blames Western feminists of presenting women of color as one entity and failing to account for diverse experiences.

Postcolonial feminist literature 
With the continued rise of global debt, labor, and environmental crises, the precarious position of women (especially in the global south) has become a prevalent concern of postcolonial feminist literature. Other themes include the impact of mass migration to metropolitan urban centers, economic terrorism, and how to decolonize the imagination from the multiple binds of writing as a woman of color. Pivotal novels include Nawal El Saadawi's The Fall of the Iman about the lynching of women, Chimamanda Adichie's Half of a Yellow Sun about two sisters in pre and post war Nigeria, and Giannina Braschi's United States of Banana about Puerto Rican independence. Other major works of postcolonial feminist literature include novels by Maryse Condé, Fatou Diome, and Marie Ndiaye, poetry by Cherríe Moraga, Giannina Braschi, and Sandra Cisneros, and the autobiography of Audre Lorde (Zami: A New Spelling of My Name).

Maria Lugones’ “Toward a Decolonial Feminism” is another piece of postcolonial feminist literature that explores gender norms in relation to the Indigenous people of the United States and the oppression that came with Christianity and the bourgeoisie.

Further reading 
 Olive Senior: The Two Grandmothers (belletristic)
 Shirley Geok-lin Lim: Between Women (poetry)
 Chandra Talpade Mohanty: Feminism Without Borders: Decolonizing Theory, Practicing Solidarity (novel)

Critiques
As postcolonial feminism is itself a critique of Western feminism, criticism of postcolonial feminism is often understood as a push back from Western feminism in defense of its aims. One way in which the Western feminist movement criticizes postcolonial feminism is on the grounds that breaking down women into smaller groups to address the unique qualities and diversity of each individual causes the entire movement of feminism to lose purpose and power. This criticism claims that postcolonial feminism is divisive, arguing that the overall feminist movement will be stronger if women can present a united front.

Another critique of postcolonial feminism is much the same as the critiques that postcolonial feminism has for Western feminism. Like Western feminism, postcolonial feminism and Third World feminism are also in danger of being ethnocentric, limited by only addressing what is going on in their own culture at the expense of other parts of the world. Colonialism also embodies many different meanings for people and has occurred across the world with different timelines. Chatterjee supports the argument that postcolonial perspective repels "Holistic perspectives of the grand narrative of enlightenment, industrial revolution, and rationality render 'other' histories and people invisible under hegemonic constructions of truth and normalcy." Generalizing colonialism can be extremely problematic as it translates into postcolonial feminism due to the contextual 'when, what, where, which, whose, and how' Suki Ali mentions in determining the postcolonial.

Sara Suleri is a common critic of postcolonial feminism, in her work “Woman Skin Deep: Feminism and the Postcolonial Condition” she questions whether the language used in feminism and ethnicity were not so similar, if racial identity and feminism would be connected or “so radically inseparable” from each other. She also states that postcolonial feminism is “not matched with any logical or theoretical consistency” because it reduces sexuality to “the literal structure of the racial body” which is not consistent with postcolonial feminism's stance on the removal of oppressive labels and categorization. 

While postcolonial discourse has brought significant expansion of knowledge regarding feminist work, scholars have begun to rework and critique the field of postcolonial feminism developing a more well-rounded discourse termed transnational feminism. Where postcolonial theory highlighted representation and the "othering" of experience of those in the global South, transnational feminism aids in understanding "new global realities resulting from migrations and the creation of transnational communities."

Postcolonial feminism is also criticized for the implications behind its name. The term "postcolonial", consisting of the prefix "post-" and suffix "colonial", insinuates that the countries it is referring to have left the era of colonialism and are progressing from it. This way of thinking promotes the idea that all developing countries underwent colonizing and began the process of decolonizing at the same time when countries referred to as "postcolonial" have actually endured colonization for different time frames. Some of the countries that are called "postcolonial" can in fact still be considered colonial. Another issue with the term "postcolonial" is that it implies a linear progression of the countries it addresses, which starkly contrasts the goal of postcolonial theory and postcolonial feminism to move away from a presentist narrative.

See also

 Chicana feminism
 Coloniality of gender
 Feminationalism
 Global feminism
 Gypsy feminism
 History of feminism
 Imperial feminism
 Indigenous feminism
 Intersectionality
 Islamic feminism
 Latinx philosophy
 Postfeminism
 Purplewashing
 Sex segregation and Islam
 Transnational feminism
 Womanism

References

External links
 
Gould, Rebecca Ruth (2014) "Engendering Critique: Postnational Feminism in Postcolonial Syria," Women's Studies Quarterly Vol. 42, No. 3/4
Lugo-Lugo. Carmen R (2000) https://public.wsu.edu/~amerstu/dis/content/12-00/1a.html

Feminism
Feminist movements and ideologies
Feminist theory
Multicultural feminism
Feminism and history
Intersectional feminism